Hancom Office, formerly ThinkFree Office, is a proprietary office suite that includes a word processor, spreadsheet software, presentation software, and a PDF editor as well as their online versions accessible via an internet browser. ThinkFree Online which was the first compatible web-based online office in the world,

Hancom Office is written in Java and C++ that runs on Windows, Linux, Macintosh, Android and iOS platforms. It is primarily addressed to Korean users.

References

External links 

Ajax (programming)
Web applications
Office suites for Linux
Office suites